The word abrek is a North Caucasian term used for a lone North Caucasian warrior living a partisan lifestyle outside power and law and fighting for a just cause. Abreks were irregular soldiers who abandoned all material life, including their family and friends, in order to fight for a just cause, to worship, and to meditate. The term was mostly used by people who struggled against Russian colonialism, mostly a guerrilla struggle during Russian expansion in the North Caucasus in the 19th century. An abrek would renounce any contact with friends and relatives, and then dedicate his life to praying and fighting for justice. Some abreks stole from the rich to give to the poor while others protected Caucasian villages from foreign attacks. The abrek lifestyle included a lonely life in the unexplored wilderness. Later, the majority of abreks became devoted Sufi Muslims. 
During the Caucasian War, which is divided into the Russo-Circassian War and the Murid War, there was constant raids between Russian and Caucasian settlements. 

In  Circassian, the word "Abrek" means "brave warrior", and in Chechen-Ingush and Avar it means "avenger". In Russian the word abrek (абрек) has the derogatory meaning of "bandit",  as the Russians have historically been enemies of the abrek lifestyle.

The word abrek was used in propaganda to label the anti-Russian guerrillas of the North Caucasus after the Caucasian War of 1817-1864, as well as for all illegals. Abreks were popularized as the defenders of the fatherland and as paupers. In their old age, the abreks of the West Caucasus usually devoted themselves to beekeeping. The majority of the East Caucasus abreks were killed in non-stop warfare against the federal army.

After the establishment of Soviet power in the Caucasus in the 1920s, abreks continued to resist, for the most part in Chechnya. Chechen abreks provoked the rebellions of 1920-21, 1929–31, 1931-1939, and the last in 1940-44, that led to the deportation of the Chechens and Ingush in 1944. The last anti-Soviet Chechen abrek was killed on 28 March 1976 at the age of 70.

History

During this time, usually a Caucasian became an abrek, having taken a vow of revenge due to grief, shame or resentment. The newly appeared abrek left his native society and wandered, left to himself. From that moment on, there were no more laws for him, and even his own life was not valuable to him, he dedicated his entire existece to fighting for a specific purpose. Therefore, a meeting with an abrek was considered dangerous. In addition, abreks almost never surrendered, preferring to fight to the death death or commit suicide. Circassian abreks were also known as Khadzhiret.

The Russians were habitually raided by the Chechens and the Ingush. Primary Chechen targets were Cossacks who occupied their lowlands. Primary Ingush targets were Russian trade, banking, and mail services, because of the proximity of the Georgian Military Road, a major artery connecting Russia and Georgia. Both hatred of Slavs (Chechens generally failed to see the distinction between Russians and Cossacks, and to this day they may be used as synonyms) and the need either to fill the mouths of hungry children or to regain lost lands played a vital role.

The Chechen abreks were the focal point of this conflict and are almost symbolic of the two different viewpoints. The Russian view on the abreks is that they were simply mountain bandits, a typical example of Chechen barbarism; however, they were depicted as men of honor by some Russian authors. The Chechen view is that they were heroes of valor, much like Robin Hood. As Moshe Gammer points out in his book Lone Wolf and Bear, Soviet ideology fell somewhere in between the two views―and notably, one such abrek, Zelimkhan, was made a Chechen hero.

See also
Zelimkhan Gushmazukayev – the most prominent Chechen abrek
Osman Mutuyev – Chechen abrek famous for his noble character
Khasukha Magomadov – Chechen abrek, killed by KGB
Buzurtanov – Ingush abrek who killed Russian viceroy to Ingushetia colonel Mitnik. Executed by Russian communists on the orders of Chernoglaz.
Uzhakhov – Ingush abrek who killed Soviet Communist leader of Ingushetia Chernoglaz. Executed by Russian communists.
Sulumbek of Sagopshi – Ingush abrek and a close friend of Zelimkhan Gushmazukayev
Akhmed Khuchbarov – Ingush abrek, killed by the NKVD
Laisat Baisarova – Ingush woman-sniper who is alleged to have murdered scores of Russian soldiers and NKVD officers 1944-1991. Never killed or captured.
Khizir Khadziev – Ingush abrek who attacked NKVD detachments, killed by the NKVD.

References

External links 
Rebecca Ruth Gould: The Abrek in Chechen Folklore

History of the North Caucasus
Resistance to the Russian Empire